The Liège Medal was an unofficial World War I campaign medal issued by the Belgian city of Liège to its 1914 defenders against the German invaders.  It was first issued in April 1920 during a large ceremony presided by the Duke of Brabant (the future King Leopold III) and Lieutenant General the Count Gérard-Mathieu Leman, military commander of the defence of Liège during the battle which raged from the 5th to the 16th of August 1914.  The stubborn defence of the city forced the Germans to bring in specialised extra heavy artillery to take on the city fortifications.

Statute
The Liège Medal was awarded to the military defenders of the city of Liège who took part in the Battle of Liège.  It was also later awarded to residents of the city of Liège who were condemned to imprisonment by a German tribunal following the battle and received the Political Prisoners' Medal.

Although unofficial in nature being bestowed by the city of Liège and not the state, such was the national pride and prestige surrounding the valiant 1914 defence of the city that the medal was allowed for wear on the military uniform.

Award description
The Liège Medal was a 35mm in diameter circular medal struck from bronze with a 2mm wide raised edge on both sides.  Being unofficial, some recipients had theirs gilded or silvered.  The raised edge bore laurel leaves on both sides along its entire circumference.  The obverse bore the relief image of the Liège Perron superimposed over a decoration akin the French Legion of Honour and bisecting the year "19" "14".  Along the circumference, the relief inscription "LA VILLE DE LIÈGE A SES VAILLANTS DEFENSEVRS" translating into "THE CITY OF LIÈGE TO ITS VALIANT DEFENDERS".  The reverse bore the relief image of a battle scene including soldiers fighting on near a partly destroyed bunker on the bank of the Meuse river.

The medal was suspended by two interlocking rings, the lower one passing through a suspension loop atop the medal, to a 38mm wide silk moiré half red and half yellow ribbon, the colours of the city of Liège.

Notable recipients (partial list)
Lieutenant General the Count Gérard-Mathieu Leman

See also

Battle of Liège

References
 Quinot H., 1950, Recueil illustré des décorations belges et congolaises, 4e Edition. (Hasselt)
 Cornet R., 1982, Recueil des dispositions légales et réglementaires régissant les ordres nationaux belges. 2e Ed. N.pl.,  (Brussels)
 Borné A.C., 1985, Distinctions honorifiques de la Belgique, 1830-1985 (Brussels)

External links
 The Battle of Liege, 1914
 Siege of Liege, 5–15 August 1914
 The Fortresses of Liège
Les Ordres Nationaux Belges (In French)
Bibliothèque royale de Belgique (In French)
ARS MORIENDI Notables from Belgian history (In French and Dutch)

Military awards and decorations of Belgium
Awards established in 1920
1920 establishments in Belgium